Hoseynabad-e Luli (also Romanized as Ḩoseynābād-e Lūlī) is a village in Mohammadabad Rural District, in the Central District of Anbarabad County, Kerman Province, Iran. At the 2006 census, its population was 289, in 62 families.

References 

Populated places in Anbarabad County